The Online Film Critics Society Award for Best Actress is an annual film award given by the Online Film Critics Society to honor the best lead actress of the year. 

Natalie Portman, Naomi Watts and Reese Witherspoon have each won this award twice. Cate Blanchett has been awarded three times.

Winners

1990s

2000s

2010s

2020s

Notes

References
OFCS – Awards

Film awards for lead actress